The EuroCup Women 2012–13 will be the eleventh edition of FIBA Europe's second-tier international competition for women's basketball clubs under such name. It will be contested by 30 teams from 15 countries, and it is scheduled to run from 24 October 2012 to 14 March 2013.

Group stage

Round of 16

Quarterfinals

Semifinals

Final

References

EuroCup Women seasons
2012–13 in European women's basketball leagues